Best Destiny is pop singer Miliyah Kato's fourth album, and first greatest hits collection. She described Best Destiny as the "Sampling Best [of·Miliyah Kato as a R&B musician]". It was released on November 5, 2008, and debuted on at number 1 on the Oricon weekly chart. The album sold 92,423 copies that week, becoming her first number 1 album on the charts. Best Destiny is certified Platinum by the Recording Industry Association of Japan. One single was taken from the album, "Sayonara Baby/Koi Shiteru" six weeks before the album's release. The second A-side  was only featured.

Track listing

Charts, sales and certifications

References

External links 
 Official Website 

2008 greatest hits albums
2008 video albums
Miliyah Kato albums
Music video compilation albums